Events in the year 1966 in Spain.

Incumbents
Caudillo: Francisco Franco

Births
May 2 - Pedro Jufresa.
June 18 - Harri Garmendia.
June 21 - Lucas Alcaraz.
June 23 - María Isabel Salinas.
July 12 - Alejandro Menéndez.
August 20 - Miguel Albaladejo.
December 12 - Lydia Zimmermann.

Deaths

 13 July - Princess Beatrice of Saxe-Coburg and Gotha (Duchess of Galliera) (born 1884 in the United Kingdom)

See also
 List of Spanish films of 1966

References

 
Years of the 20th century in Spain
1960s in Spain
Spain
Spain